Batuhan Aydın (born July 14, 1991) is a Turkish composer, ethnomusicologist and virtuoso kaval player based in Istanbul, Turkey. He is noted for the fusion of Balkans folk and Turkish folk music with western jazz. Aydın's compositions include music from Turkish, Bulgarian and Balkans folk.

Biography

Early life
Aydın was born in 1991, in Istanbul. His mother's family originates from Ludogorie region in Bulgaria where as his father's family originates from Gümüşhane, Turkey. Aydın's parents are professional musicians and folk dancers. He started playing percussion at an early age of three while emulating his father. In 2003, at the age of twelve, Aydın formed a folk dance ensemble in Istanbul.

Aydın was accepted to study at the high school of the Istanbul Technical University Turkish Music State Conservatory where he was trained to play kaval, a chromatic end-blown flute traditionally played throughout the Balkans and Anatolia region. He studied with Cihan Yurtçu and continued his instrumental education with Serdar Deli and later with Haydar Tanrıverdi. Before entering the Musicology department of the Istanbul Technical University Turkish Music State Conservatory, Aydın studied kaval and Bulgarian folk music with Lyuben Dossev at the Academy of Music, Dance and Fine Arts "Prof. Asen Diamandiev" in Plovdiv, Bulgaria.

Career
Aydın began his professional career in 2010 when he became a member of the Turkish Radio and Television Corporation (TRT)'s Youth Orchestra in Istanbul. He worked as the lead kaval player for TRT till 2013. During these years, Aydın performed at various concerts and festivals throughout Turkey and Europe and continues to do so.

In the year 2014, Aydın was invited to the first International Kaval Conference in Istanbul. He was the youngest instrumentalist to perform at the event. From 2015 to 2019, Aydın toured through Europe and held various masterclasses and seminars on Bulgarian folk music as well as on the advanced playing techniques of the Bulgarian kaval.

Apart from playing the kaval as a soloist and as an orchestra musician in a variety of ensembles, Aydın is the founder and lead kaval player for KAPIKO, an ethno jazz-fusion band based in Istanbul. Austrian composer and pianist, Nikolaus Grill, is also a member of the band.

Discography 
 KAPIKO "On Bierli" (2013)
 BALKAN BLOW ''"Veligdensko Oro"'(2018)

References

External links
Official website

Living people
Musicians from Istanbul
1991 births
Istanbul Technical University alumni